Jean de Ligne, Duke of Arenberg (c. 1525 – 1568) was Baron of Barbançon, founder of the House of Arenberg and stadtholder of the Dutch provinces of Friesland, Groningen, Drenthe and Overijssel from 1549 until his death.

He was the son of Louis de Ligne, Baron of Barbançon from the House of Ligne and Marie of Glymes, Lady of Zevenbergen (1503–1566), daughter of Cornelis of Glymes.

Jean de Ligne belonged to the closest circles around Charles V and was made a Knight in the Order of the Golden Fleece in 1546. In 1549 he became stadtholder of the Northern provinces of Friesland, Groningen, Drenthe and Overijssel. By his marriage to  Marguerite de la Marck-Arenberg, sister of Robert III von der Marck-Arenberg who died without children, he became the founder of the third House of Arenberg. 

He participated in the campaign in France and distinguished himself in the Battle of St. Quentin (1557) where he, together with Henry V, Duke of Brunswick-Lüneburg, led the left wing of the infantry in the final attack against the French.

At the start of the rebellion he distanced himself of his good friend William the Silent, Lamoral, Count of Egmont and Philip de Montmorency, Count of Hoorn, and remained loyal to the King Philip II of Spain.

He was unable to stop the spread of Protestantism in his Northern provinces, but succeeded in 1567 to keep them loyal to the Crown without bloodshed. 

Back south, he joined the army under the Duke of Alva, but objected against the arrests of Egmont and Hoorn.
When Louis and Adolf of Nassau (brothers of William I of Orange) invaded Groningen, he was sent back by Alva to repulse this army.  

There he was killed in the Battle of Heiligerlee on 23 May 1568. Cardinal Granvelle described his death as a great loss for the Catholic faith and the King.

Arenberg was buried in the Saint Catherine Church in Zevenbergen, and his remains were moved in 1614 to the family vault in Enghien.

He had seven children, amongst whom:
 Charles de Ligne, 2nd Prince of Arenberg (1550–1616), his successor
 Margareth (1552–1611), married in 1569 with Philip of Lalaing
 Robert (1564–1614), first Prince of Barbançon
 Antonia Wilhelmina (1557–1626), married in 1577 with Salentin IX of Isenburg-Grenzau, Archbishop of Cologne, who left the clergy to marry her.

References

External links
Biography (in Dutch)
Archives and Cultural Centre of Arenberg

1520s births
1568 deaths
Year of birth uncertain
Dutch stadtholders
Jean de Ligne
Jean
Knights of the Golden Fleece
Lords of Zuid-Polsbroek
Military personnel killed in action
Military personnel of the Holy Roman Empire
Nobility of the Spanish Netherlands
Royal reburials